Colby Fulfer is an American politician who served in the Arkansas Senate representing the Springdale area from 2022 to 2023.

Education 
Fulfer graduated from the Shiloh Christian School.

Career 
Fulfer worked at the Westfield Chapel Funeral Home and serves as chief of staff to Springdale Mayor Doug Sprouse. A Republican, he was narrowly elected to the Arkansas Senate in a 2022 special election to replace Lance Eads, who had resigned in 2021. 

He assumed office on February 22, 2022 and served during the fiscal session of the 93rd Arkansas General Assembly, as well as a special session called by Governor Asa Hutchinson, and did not seek reelection.

Electoral history

References

Living people
Republican Party Arkansas state senators
21st-century American politicians
Year of birth missing (living people)